The 2002 New Zealand general election was held on 27 July 2002 to determine the composition of the 47th New Zealand Parliament. It saw the reelection of Helen Clark's Labour Party government, as well as the worst-ever performance by the opposition National Party. The 2020 election would see it suffer a greater defeat in terms of net loss of seats.

A controversial issue in the election campaign was the end of a moratorium on genetic engineering, strongly opposed by the Green Party. Some commentators have claimed that the tension between Labour and the Greens on this issue was a more notable part of the campaign than any tension between Labour and its traditional right-wing opponents.  The release of Nicky Hager's book Seeds of Distrust prior to the election also sparked much debate. The book examined how the government handled the contamination of a shipment of imported corn with genetically modified seeds. Helen Clark called the Greens "goths and anarcho-feminists" during the campaign.

Background
On  12 June the government announced that the country would have a general election on 27 July. This was several months earlier than was required, a fact which caused considerable comment. The Prime Minister, Helen Clark, claimed that an early poll was necessary due to the collapse of her junior coalition partner, the Alliance. Critics, however, claimed that Clark could have continued to govern, and that the early election was called to take advantage of Labour's strong position in the polls. Some commentators believe that a mixture of these factors was responsible.

Before the election, the Labour Party held 49 seats in parliament. It governed in coalition with the smaller (and more left-wing) Alliance, which had 10 seats. It also relied on support from the Greens, but this was a largely informal arrangement, and the Greens were not a part of the administration itself. Opposing Labour were the National Party (centre-right),  United Future (centrist), New Zealand First (populist), ACT New Zealand (free-market). Many opinion polls for the election indicated that Labour was popular enough to conceivably win an absolute majority, leaving it able to govern without the support of smaller parties. Labour's dominance over National was such that for many people, the question was not whether Labour would win, but whether Labour would receive the absolute majority it sought.

MPs retiring in 2002
Eleven MPs, including two Alliance MPs, six National MPs, and two Labour MPs intended to retire at the end of the 46th Parliament.

The election
There were 2,670,030 registered voters, the highest number for any election in New Zealand. However, only 77% of these registered voters chose to cast a vote, a considerable drop from previous elections. Many commentators cited Labour's dominance in the polls as a reason for this low turnout. Many people saw the outcome as inevitable, and so did not bother to vote at all.

In the election 683 candidates stood, and there were 14 registered parties with party lists. Of the candidates, 433 were electorate and list, 160 were electorate only, and 90 were list only. 71% of candidates (487) were male and 29% (196) female.

Summary of results
As most people expected, Labour was victorious. It did not, however, receive an absolute majority, gaining only 52 seats (eight seats short of the half-way mark). Labour's former coalition partner, the Alliance (which had splintered shortly before the election), was not returned to parliament. However, the new Progressive Coalition (now the Progressive Party) started by former Alliance leader Jim Anderton won two seats, and remained allied with Labour. The Greens, who were now distanced from Labour over the genetic engineering controversy, gained nine seats (an increase of two).

In general, it was a bad election for the parties of the right. The National Party, once referred to as "the natural party of government", suffered its worst-ever electoral defeat, gaining only 21% of the vote. ACT New Zealand, National's more right-wing neighbour, failed to capitalise on the exodus of National supporters, retaining the same number of seats as before. Instead, the most notable gains among opposition parties were made by two centrist parties. One of these was Winston Peters's New Zealand First, a populist and nationalist party opposed to immigration. Strong campaigning by Peters allowed the party to recover from its serious losses in the 1999 election. The other was United Future New Zealand party, a centrist party based on a merger of the United Party and the Future New Zealand party - primarily due to the performance of leader Peter Dunne, the party shot from having one seat to having eight seats.

Once the final distribution of seats was determined, it was clear that Labour would be at the centre of the government, and that it would be allied with the Progressives. However, this still left Labour needing support in matters of confidence and supply, as the two parties together fell short of an absolute majority. Labour expressed a preference for an "agreement" rather than a full coalition, hoping to establish an arrangement similar to the one that existed with the Greens prior to the election. Three realistic choices existed for a partner - the Greens, United Future, and New Zealand First. Labour had repeatedly ruled out deals with New Zealand First during the election campaign, and reaffirmed this soon after the election, leaving just the Greens and United Future as candidates. After a period of negotiation, Labour opted to ally with United Future, being unwilling to change their genetic engineering policies to secure the Green Party's support.

Labour and the Progressives remained in power, with support in confidence and supply votes from United Future.

Detailed results

Parliamentary parties

| colspan=12 align=center| 
|- style="text-align:center;"
! colspan=2 rowspan=2 style="width:213px;" | Party
! Colspan=3 | Party vote
! Colspan=3 | Electorate vote
! Colspan=4 | Seats
|- style="text-align:center;"
! Votes
! %
! Change(pp)
! Votes
! %
! Change(pp)
! List
! Electorate
! Total
! +/-
|-
| 
| 838,219
| 41.26
| 2.52
| 891,866
| 44.69
| 2.94
| 7
| 45
| 52
| 3
|-
| 
| 425,310
| 20.93
| 9.57
| 609,458
| 30.54
| 1.38
| 6
| 21
| 27
| 12
|-
| 
| 210,912
| 10.38
| 6.12
| 79,380
| 3.98
| 0.21
| 12
| 1
| 13
| 8
|-
| 
| 145,078
| 7.14
| 0.10
| 70,888
| 3.55
| 0.97
| 9
| 0
| 9
| 
|-
| 
| 142,250
| 7.00
| 1.84
| 106,717
| 5.35
| 1.14
| 9
| 0
| 9
| 2
|-
| 
| 135,918
| 6.69
| 5.04a
| 92,484
| 4.63
| 2.59a
| 7
| 1
| 8
| 7
|-
| 
| 34,542
| 1.70
| new
| 36,647
| 1.84
| new
| 1
| 1
| 2
| new
|-
| 
| 27,492
| 1.35
| 1.03
| 40,810
| 2.05
| 0.14
| 0
| 0
| 0
| 
|-
| 
| 25,985
| 1.28
| new
| —
| —
| —
| 0
| 0
| 0
| new
|-
| 
| 25,888
| 1.27
| 6.47
| 33,655
| 1.69
| 5.21
| 0
| 0
| 0
| 10
|-
| 

| 12,987
| 0.64
| 0.46
| 3,397
| 0.17
| 0.17
| 0
| 0
| 0
| 
|-
|
| 4,980
| 0.25
| 
| 8,130
| 0.41
| 0.22
|
| 0
| 0
| 
|-
|
| 1,782
| 0.09
| 0.03
| 2,617
| 0.13
| 0.12
| 0
| 0
| 0
| 
|-
|
| 274
| 0.01
| 0.04
| —
| —
| 0.03
| 
| 0
| 0
| 
|-
|
| —
| —
| 0.29
| 672
| 0.03
| 0.03
| 0
| 0
| 0
| 
|-
| style="background-color:#ffffff" |
| style="text-align:left;" |Unregistered parties
| —
| —
| —
| 3,821
| 0.19
| 0.08
| 0
| 0
| 0
| 
|-
| 
| —
| —
| —
| 14,927
| 0.75
| 0.37
| 0
| 0
| 0
| 
|-
! colspan=2 style="text-align:left;" |Valid votes
! 2,031,617
! 98.84
! 1.74
! 1,995,586
! 97.09
! 0.84
! Colspan=4 |
|-
| colspan=2 style="text-align:left;" | Informal vote
| 8,631
| 0.42
| 0.51
| 26,529
| 1.29
| 0.49
| Colspan=4 |
|-
| colspan=2 style="text-align:left;" | Disallowed votes
| 15,156
| 0.74
| 1.23
| 33,289
| 1.62
| 0.35
| Colspan=5 |
|-
! colspan=2 style="text-align:left;" | Total
! 2,055,404
! 100
!
! 2,055,404
! 100
!
! 51
! 69
! 120
!
|-
| colspan=2 style="text-align:left;" | Eligible voters and Turnout
| 2,670,030
| 76.98
| 7.79
| 2,670,030
| 76.98
| 7.79
| Colspan=4 |
|}

Party vote by electorate

Votes summary

Electorate results

Of the 69 electorates in the 2002 election, a majority (45) were won by the Labour Party. The opposition National Party won 21 electorate seats. Labour dominated the urban areas, where it has traditionally been strongest, while National performed best in rural areas. However, Labour's strong position in this election led to National losing ground in a number of its traditional strongholds. The loss of Otago electorate, a rural area, was one notable example.

Labour also dominated in the seven Maori seats. National gained second place in only one Maori electorate, with Labour's main rivals being the Mana Maori Movement, the Greens, and the Alliance.

Of the minor parties, only three managed to win electorates, mostly due to the strong personal following of the incumbents. United Future leader Peter Dunne retained his strong support in the Wellington electorate of Ohariu-Belmont, while New Zealand First leader Winston Peters retained Tauranga. Progressive leader Jim Anderton retained the Christchurch seat of Wigram, which he had formerly held as leader of the Alliance.

The table below shows the results of the 2002 general election:

Key:

|-
| colspan="8"  style="background:#eee; text-align:center;"| Māori electorates
|-
! Electorate !! colspan=2 | Incumbent !! colspan=2 | Winner !! Majority !! colspan=2 | Runner-up
|-

|}

List results

MPs returned via party lists, and unsuccessful candidates, were as follows:

*Chal was ranked fifth on the United Future list and was declared elected, serving as an MP for 17 days. However, it emerged that Chal was not actually eligible to stand for election, as she was not a New Zealand citizen. As a result, she was removed from the party list.
Notes
 These party list members later entered parliament in the term as other list MPs elected resigned from parliament.
 These party list members later resigned during the parliamentary term.

Summary of seat changes
 Electoral redistributions:
 A minor reconfiguration of electorates and their boundaries occurred between the 1999 and 2002 elections. Five seats were abolished and seven were created, giving a net increase of two electorates.
 The seats of Albany, Hunua, Karapiro, Titirangi and Hauraki (Maori) ceased to exist.
 The seats of Clevedon, East Coast Bays, Helensville, New Lynn, Piako, Tainui (Maori) and Tamaki Makaurau (Maori) came into being.
 Seats captured:
 By Labour: Hamilton East, Otago and Waitakere were captured from National.
 By National: Coromandel was captured from the Greens.
 The seat of Wigram transferred from the Alliance to the Progressives due to a change of its MP's party affiliation.
 Seats transferred from departing MPs to new MPs:
 The seat of Rakaia, held by a departing National MP, was won by a new National candidate.
 The seats of Mana, Napier, Otaki, and Te Tai Hauauru, all held by departing Labour MPs, were won by new Labour candidates (although the departing Mana MP became a list MP and the departing Te Tai Hauauru MP returned to Parliament in another electorate).
 Labour list seats: Lost 1 (was 8, fell to 7)
 Retired: 1
 Became electorate MPs: 3
 Re-elected: 4
 Newly elected: 3 (including a former electorate MP)
 National list seats: Lost 11 (was 17, fell to 6)
 Retired: 4
 Re-elected: 5
 Not re-elected: 8
 Newly elected: 1
 New Zealand First list seats: Gained 8 (was 4, rose to 12)
 Re-elected: 4
 Newly elected: 8
 ACT list seats: No change (was 9, remained 9)
 Re-elected: 7
 Not re-elected: 2
 Newly elected: 2
 Green list seats: Gained 3 (was 6, rose to 9)
 Re-elected: 6
 Newly elected: 3 (including a former electorate MP)
 Alliance list seats: Lost 9 (was 9, fell to 0)
 Retired: 1
 Not re-elected: 3
 (Transferred to Progressives: 5)
 United Future list seats: Gained 7 (was 0, rose to 7)
 Newly elected: 7
 Progressive list seats: Gained 1 (was 0, rose to 1)
 (Transferred from Alliance: 5)
 Retired: 2
 Re-elected: 1
 Not re-elected: 2

References

Further reading

External links

 Official election results 

 
July 2002 events in New Zealand